Orahovo may refer to:

Bosnia and Herzegovina
 Orahovo (Breza)
 Orahovo, Foča
 Pobrđe Orahovo, in Kiseljak
 Orahovo, Travnik

Montenegro
 Orahovo, Bar, a village
 Orahovo, Petnjica
 Orahovo Monastery in Bar

Serbia
 Orahovo (Raška)